Hawkins is a village in Rusk County, Wisconsin, United States. The population was 305 at the 2010 census. The village is located within the Town of Hawkins.

History
The community was most likely named for Marsh P. Hawkins, who was the secretary and treasurer of the Minneapolis & St. Louis division of the Minneapolis, St. Paul & Sault Ste. Marie Railroad in the 1880s.

Geography
Hawkins is located at  (45.512448, -90.713483).

Hawkins is along U.S. Highway 8 and County Road M.

Demographics

2010 census
As of the census of 2010, there were 305 people, 159 households, and 84 families living in the village. The racial makeup of the village was 97.0% White, 0.3% Native American, 0.3% Asian, 0.3% from other races, and 2.0% from two or more races.

There were 159 households, of which 18.9% had children under the age of 18 living with them, 40.9% were married couples living together, 7.5% had a female householder with no husband present, 4.4% had a male householder with no wife present, and 47.2% were non-families. 40.9% of all households were made up of individuals, and 18.8% had someone living alone who was 65 years of age or older. The average household size was 1.92 and the average family size was 2.56.

The median age in the village was 47.5 years. 17.7% of residents were under the age of 18; 2.7% were between the ages of 18 and 24; 21.9% were from 25 to 44; 36.1% were from 45 to 64; and 21.6% were 65 years of age or older. The gender makeup of the village was 52.5% male and 47.5% female.

2000 census
As of the census of 2000, there were 317 people, 138 households, and 92 families living in the village. The population density was 144.8 people per square mile (55.9/km2). There were 147 housing units at an average density of 67.2 per square mile (25.9/km2). The racial makeup of the village was 98.11% White, 0.32% from other races, and 1.58% from two or more races. 0.00% of the population were Hispanic or Latino of any race.

There were 138 households, out of which 22.5% had children under the age of 18 living with them, 56.5% were married couples living together, 6.5% had a female householder with no husband present, and 33.3% were non-families. 26.1% of all households were made up of individuals, and 12.3% had someone living alone who was 65 years of age or older. The average household size was 2.30 and the average family size was 2.79.

In the village, the population was spread out, with 19.2% under the age of 18, 10.7% from 18 to 24, 24.9% from 25 to 44, 24.6% from 45 to 64, and 20.5% who were 65 years of age or older. The median age was 42 years. For every 100 females, there were 105.8 males. For every 100 females age 18 and over, there were 101.6 males.

The median income for a household in the village was $29,286, and the median income for a family was $39,250. Males had a median income of $28,250 versus $23,393 for females. The per capita income for the village was $17,159. About 3.2% of families and 3.6% of the population were below the poverty line, including none of those under age 18 and 10.8% of those age 65 or over.

References

External links
 Village of Hawkins, Wisconsin website

Villages in Rusk County, Wisconsin
Villages in Wisconsin